The Agriculture and Fisheries functional constituency is a functional constituency in the elections for the Legislative Council of Hong Kong first created in 1998. The constituency is composed of eight agriculture and 75 fisheries organisations.

A similar Primary Production, Power and Construction functional constituency was created for the 1995 election by Governor Chris Patten was composed of much broaden electorate.

Return members

Electoral results
Instant-runoff voting system is used from 1998 to 2021. Since 2021, first-past-the-post voting system is in use.

2020s

2010s

2000s

1990s

References

Constituencies of Hong Kong
Constituencies of Hong Kong Legislative Council
Functional constituencies (Hong Kong)
1998 establishments in Hong Kong
Constituencies established in 1998
Agriculture in Hong Kong
Fisheries in Hong Kong